The North Sea Jazz Festival is an annual festival held each second weekend of July in the Netherlands at the Ahoy venue. It used to be in The Hague but since 2006 it has been held in Rotterdam. This is because the Statenhal where the festival was held before was demolished in 2006. As of 3 November 2017 the festival officially will be known as the NN North Sea Jazz Festival.

Biography 

The founder of the three-day festival was Paul Acket, a businessman and jazz lover who made a fortune in the 1960s with his pop magazine publishing company. When Acket sold his company in 1975, he was able to start and sponsor the North Sea Jazz Festival. Acket wanted to present American jazz and European avant-garde jazz. In 1976 the first edition of the festival took place. It was an immediate success: six stages, thirty hours of music, and 300 performances drew over 9000 visitors. Acts included Count Basie, Miles Davis, Billy Eckstine,  Stan Getz, Dizzy Gillespie, James Taylor, Benny Goodman, and Sarah Vaughan among others.

The Edison Jazz Awards and the Bird Awards are presented at the North Sea Jazz Festival.

In 1990, two sub-festivals were introduced: North Sea Jazz Heats, a free festival performed in pubs throughout The Hague, and the more exclusive Midsummer Jazz Gala. Both take place on the evening before the festival. Musicians that have performed at the Midsummer Jazz Gala include Tony Bennett, Herbie Hancock, and Oscar Peterson. Amy Winehouse performed at the festival in 2004 and Adele performed in 2009. Luis Miguel performed in the 2013 edition held in Curacao.

The festival has grown to fifteen stages, 1,200 musicians, and about 25,000 visitors a day. The festival presents concerts in New Orleans jazz, swing, fusion, blues, gospel, funk, soul and drum and bass.

The festival is acknowledged as the "biggest indoor jazz festival in the world" and has a reputation for showcasing different areas of jazz from all eras.

References

External links

 Official site

1976 establishments in the Netherlands
Culture in Rotterdam
Jazz festivals in the Netherlands
July events
Music festivals established in 1976
Tourist attractions in Rotterdam